A Holy Venetian Family is a 2015 comedy film written and directed by Pietro Parolin and starring Neri Marcorè. Intended as an hommage to the classical commedia all'italiana, it was produced by the Centro Sperimentale di Cinematografia.

Plot

Cast 

Neri Marcorè as Gualtiero
 Stefano Pesce as  Alessio 
Piera Degli Esposti as Mara
 Anna Dalton as  Elisa
 Antonio Pennarella as Gennaro
 Pierpaolo Spollon as Martino
 Helene Olivi Borghese as  Irinka
 Vittorio Boscolo as  Malgaro 
 Cristina D'Alberto as  Emma
 Eugenio Krauss as  Bisol
 Giovanni Morassutti as Ragazzo compro oro

See also 
 List of Italian films of 2015

References

External links 
 

2015 comedy films
Italian comedy films
2010s Italian-language films
2010s Italian films